Ben Warner is a British data scientist.

Education 
Warner earned a PhD at University College London for research investigating single molecule spintronics. The research was supervised by Cyrus Hirjibehedin and was awarded the Marshall Stoneham prize.

Career
Warner was a postdoctoral research fellow in quantum physics at the centre for nanotechnology at University College London. He left to join ASI Data Science (now Faculty), a company founded by his brother Marc Warner in 2014, where he is now a commercial principal.

Warner was a key figure in the computer modelling used by Vote Leave's successful 2016 referendum campaign. He was brought in by Dominic Cummings to run the Conservative Party's private computer model for the 2019 general election, which predicted that the Conservative Party would win 364 seats (they won 365).

Warner served as one of the 23 members of the Scientific Advisory Group for Emergencies (SAGE) during the COVID-19 pandemic alongside Dominic Cummings.

References

British statisticians
Living people
Year of birth missing (living people)
Place of birth missing (living people)
Data scientists
Alumni of University College London